Abu Ma'shar al-Balkhi, Latinized as Albumasar (also Albusar, Albuxar; full name Abū Maʿshar Jaʿfar ibn Muḥammad ibn ʿUmar al-Balkhī   ;
10 August 787 – 9 March 886, AH 171–272), was an early Persian Muslim astrologer, thought to be the greatest astrologer of the Abbasid court in Baghdad. While he was not a major innovator, his practical manuals for training astrologers profoundly influenced Muslim intellectual history and, through translations, that of western Europe and Byzantium.

Life
Abu Ma'shar was a native of Balkh in Khurasan, one of the main bases of support of the Abbasid revolt in the early 8th century. Its population, as was generally the case in the frontier areas of the Arab conquest of Persia, remained culturally dedicated to its Sassanian and Hellenistic heritage. He probably came to Baghdad in the early years of the caliphate of al-Maʾmūn (r. 813–833). According to An-Nadim's  Al-Fihrist (10th century), he lived on the West Side of Baghdad, near Bab Khurasan, the northeast gate of the original city on the west Bank of the Tigris.

Abu Ma'shar was a member of the third generation (after the Arab Conquest) of the Pahlavi-oriented Khurasani intellectual elite, and he defended an approach of a "most astonishing and inconsistent" eclecticism. His reputation saved him from religious persecution, although there is a report of one incident where he was whipped for his practice of astrology under the caliphate of al-Musta'in (r. 862–866).
He was a scholar of hadith, and according to biographical tradition, he only turned to astrology at the age of forty-seven (832/3).
He became involved in a bitter dispute with al-Kindi (–873), the foremost Arab philosopher of his time, who was versed in Aristotelism and Neoplatonism. It was his confrontation with al-Kindi that convinced Abu Ma'shar of the need to study "mathematics" in order to understand philosophical arguments.

His foretelling of an event that subsequently occurred earned him a lashing ordered by the displeased Caliph al-Musta'in. "I hit the mark and I was severely punished."

An-Nadim includes an extract from Abu Ma'shar's book on the variations of astronomical tables, which describes how the Persian kings gathered the best writing materials in the world to preserve their books on the sciences and deposited them in the Sarwayh fortress in the city of Jayy in Isfahan. The depository continued to exist at the time an-Nadim wrote in the 10th century.

Amir Khusrav mentions that Abu Ma'shar came to Benaras (Varanasi) and studied astronomy there for ten years.

Abu Ma'shar is said to have died at the age of 98 (but a centenarian according to the Islamic year count) in Wāsiṭ in eastern Iraq, during the last two nights of Ramadan of AH 272 (9 March 866). 
Abu Ma'shar was a Persian nationalist, studying Sassanid-era astrology in his "Kitab Al-Qeranat" to predict the imminent collapse of Arab rule and the restoration of Iranian rule.

Works
His works on astronomy are not extant, but information can still be gleaned from summaries found in the works of later astronomers or from his astrology works.

 Kitāb al‐mudkhal al‐kabīr, an introduction to astrology which received many translations to Latin and Greek starting from the 11th-century. It had significant influence on Western philosophers, like Albert the Great.
 Kitāb mukhtaṣar al‐mudkhal, an abridged version of the above, later translated to Latin by Adelard of Bath.
 Kitāb al‐milal wa‐ʾl‐duwal ("Book on religions and dynasties"), probably his most important work, commented on in the major works of Roger Bacon, Pierre d'Ailly, and Pico della Mirandola.
 Fī dhikr ma tadullu ʿalayhi al‐ashkhāṣ al‐ʿulwiyya ("On the indications of the celestial objects"),
 Kitāb al‐dalālāt ʿalā al‐ittiṣālāt wa‐qirānāt al‐kawākib ("Book of the indications of the planetary conjunctions"),
 Kitāb al‐ulūf ("Book of thousands"), preserved only in summaries by Sijzī.
 Kitāb taḥāwīl sinī al-'ālam (Flowers of Abu Ma'shar), uses horoscopes to examine months and days of the year. It was a manual for astrologers. It was translated in the 12th century by John of Seville.
 Kitāb taḥāwil sinī al‐mawālīd ("Book of the revolutions of the years of nativities"). translated into Greek in 1000, and from that translation into Latin in the 13th century.
 Kitāb mawālīd al‐rijāl wa‐ʾl‐nisāʾ ("Book of nativities of men and women"), which was widely circulated in the Islamic world.  ʻAbd al-Ḥasan Iṣfāhānī copied excerpts into the 14th century illustrated manuscript the Kitab al-Bulhan (ca.1390).

Latin and Greek translations

Albumasar's "Introduction" (Kitāb al‐mudkhal al‐kabīr, written ) was first translated into Latin by John of Seville in 1133, as Introductorium in Astronomiam, and again, less literally and abridged, as De magnis coniunctionibus, by Herman of Carinthia in 1140.
Lemay (1962) argued that the writings of Albumasar were very likely the single most important original source for the recovery of Aristotle for medieval European scholars prior to the middle of the 12th century.

Herman of Carinthia's translation, De magnis coniunctionibus, was first printed by Erhard Ratdolt of Augsburg in 1488/9.
It was again printed in Venice, in 1506 and 1515.

Modern editions:
De magnis coniunctionibus, ed.  K. Yamamoto, Ch. Burnett, Leiden, 2000, 2 vols. (Arabic & Latin text).
De revolutionibus nativitatum, ed. D. Pingree, Leipzig, 1968 (Greek text).
Liber florum ed. James Herschel Holden in Five Medieval Astrologers (Tempe, Az.: A.F.A., Inc., 2008): 13–66.
Introductorium maius, ed. R. Lemay, Napoli, 1995–1996, 9 vols. (Arabic text & two Latin translations).
Ysagoga minor, ed.  Ch. Burnett, K. Yamamoto, M. Yano, Leiden-New York, 1994 (Arabic & Latin text).
 The Great Introduction to Astrology, The Arabic Original and English Translation. Edited and translated by Keiji Yamamoto, Charles Burnett, Leiden-Boston, Brill, 2019.

See also

Islamic astrology
List of Iranian scientists

Notes

References

Bibliography

  (PDF version)

External links
 Abu Ma'shar al-Balkhi at the Encyclopedia Iranica

787 births
886 deaths
People from Balkh
Astrological writers
Medieval Iranian astrologers
9th-century Iranian astronomers
9th-century astrologers
Shu'ubiyya
Astronomers from the Abbasid Caliphate
Astronomers of the medieval Islamic world
9th-century Arabic writers
9th-century people from the Abbasid Caliphate